"The South" is a song recorded by American country music band the Cadillac Three. It is their debut release for Big Machine Records.

History
Lead singer Jaren Johnston, who wrote the song, told Billboard: "I wanted something for our live set that mirrored 'Kashmir' by Led Zeppelin – maybe a southern version of that. I got into writing it, and started with the lyrics, I remembered the first time I heard 'Sweet Home Alabama,' and I was just mesmerized with it. I thought 'We need something like that.'" The song features guest vocals from Dierks Bentley, Florida Georgia Line, and Eli Young Band lead singer Mike Eli.

Critical reception
The song has received positive critical reception. Markos Papadatos of Digital Journal reviewed the song favorably, praising Johnston's lead vocals and the Southern rock influences. Billy Dukes of Taste of Country also described the song's Southern rock sound favorably. He also said that the song "has depth" and that "Johnston's voice is suited for grungy honky-tonks". Giving it 3.5 out of 5 stars, Matt Bjorke of Roughstock wrote that " there’s some nice lyrical choices…and an overall understanding of what can make an artist unique".

Music video
Shane Drake directed the song's music video.

Chart performance
The song has sold 165,000 copies in the U.S. as of May 2014.

References

2013 songs
2013 debut singles
Big Machine Records singles
The Cadillac Three songs
Dierks Bentley songs
Florida Georgia Line songs
Vocal collaborations
Songs written by Jaren Johnston
Song recordings produced by Dann Huff
Music videos directed by Shane Drake
Songs about the American South